is a passenger railway station in the city of Ōta, Gunma, Japan, operated by the private railway operator Tōbu Railway. It is numbered "TI-53".

Lines

Station layout

The station consists of two ground-level side platforms, serving two tracks. Platform 2 is connected to the station building by a footbridge.

Platforms

Adjacent stations

History
Yabuzaka Station opened on March 19, 1913.

From March 17, 2012, station numbering was introduced on all Tōbu lines, with Yabuzuka Station becoming "TI-53".

Passenger statistics
In fiscal 2019, the station was used by an average of 1097 passengers daily (boarding passengers only).

Surrounding area
former Yabzuka Town Office
Yabuzuka Main  Post Office
Yabuzuka onsen

References

External links

 Tobu station information 
	

Tobu Kiryu Line
Stations of Tobu Railway
Railway stations in Gunma Prefecture
Railway stations in Japan opened in 1913
Ōta, Gunma